Carson Valley is an unincorporated community and census-designated place (CDP) in Blair County, Pennsylvania, United States. It was first listed as a CDP prior to the 2020 census.

The CDP is in western Blair County, in the eastern part of Allegheny Township. It is named for the valley in which it sits, drained to the east by Spencer Run coming down from the Allegheny Front. Carson Valley Road leads east to Pennsylvania Route 764 at Cross Keys and west up the valley  to the foot of the Allegheny Front escarpment. U.S. Route 22, a four-lane freeway, runs south and west of Carson Valley, with the closest access to the east from PA 764.

Demographics

References 

Census-designated places in Blair County, Pennsylvania
Census-designated places in Pennsylvania